William Miller (September 10, 1825) was the 18th  Governor of the U.S. state of North Carolina from 1814 to 1817.

Born in Warren County, North Carolina, William Miller was orphaned at the age of 9 and inherited a substantial plantation. He briefly attended the University of North Carolina at Chapel Hill in 1802, but did not complete a degree. He began practicing law in 1805 and was named North Carolina Attorney General in 1810. That same year, he was elected to the North Carolina House of Commons, where he served until 1814, for two years as Speaker of the House (1812–1814).

In November 1814, Miller was elected Governor of North Carolina by the General Assembly, at the close of the War of 1812, which he supported. During his term, Miller laid the groundwork for the expansion of the state's educational system, and he served on the University of North Carolina Board of Trustees until his death.

After serving the maximum number of three one-year terms as governor, Miller left office in 1817. He returned to the North Carolina Senate in 1821, but lost a re-election bid the following year.

U.S. President John Quincy Adams appointed Miller as an envoy to Guatemala in 1825; Miller died after three days illness in Key West, Florida en route to his post.

Sources

 Biographical Directory of the Governors of the United States, 1789–1978, Robert Sobel and John Raimo, eds. Westport, CT: Meckler Books, 1978.

1780s births
1825 deaths
Governors of North Carolina
Members of the North Carolina House of Representatives
North Carolina state senators
North Carolina Democratic-Republicans
Democratic-Republican Party state governors of the United States
19th-century American politicians